Bayan (also Maanit, Maan't, Мааньт, Rich) is a sum of Töv Province in Mongolia.

References 

Districts of Töv Province